Johnathan Campbell is a Zimbabwean cricketer. He made his Twenty20 debut for Boost Defenders in the 2017 Shpageeza Cricket League on 15 September 2017. He made his first-class debut on 18 December 2019, for Rangers in the 2019–20 Logan Cup. He made his List A debut on 4 February 2020, for Rangers in the 2019–20 Pro50 Championship. In December 2020, he was selected to play for the Rhinos in the 2020–21 Logan Cup.

References

External links
 

Year of birth missing (living people)
Living people
Zimbabwean cricketers
Place of birth missing (living people)
Boost Defenders cricketers
Rangers cricketers